Palumtar is a municipality in Gorkha District in the Gandaki Zone of northern-central Nepal. It was named after the former Village Development Committee which now is part of it. At the time of the 1991 Nepal census the VDC had a population of 6,982 and had 1358 houses in the town. The municipality has 23 461 inhabitants according to the census of 2011.

References

Populated places in Gorkha District